is a public university in Yamagata, Yamagata, Japan. The predecessor of the school was founded in 1997, and it was chartered as a university in 2000.

Undergraduate program
Health and Medical Faculty
Department of Nursing
Department of Physical Therapy
Department of Occupational Therapy

Graduate program
Health and Medical Studies (master's program)
Nursing
Physical Therapy 
Occupational Therapy

External links
 Official website 

Educational institutions established in 1997
Public universities in Japan
Universities and colleges in Yamagata Prefecture
1997 establishments in Japan
Nursing schools in Japan